The University of North Texas (UNT) is a public research university in Denton, Texas. It was founded as a nonsectarian, coeducational, private teachers college in 1890 and was formally adopted by the state 11 years later. UNT is a member of the University of North Texas System, which includes additional universities in Dallas and Fort Worth. UNT also has a location in Frisco.

The university consists of 14 colleges and schools, an early admissions math and science academy for exceptional high-school-age students from across the state, the Texas Academy of Mathematics and Science, and a library system that comprises the university core. It is classified among "R1: Doctoral Universities – Very high research activity". According to the National Science Foundation, UNT spent $78.4 million on research and development in 2019.

Campus
The main campus is located in Denton, TX, part of the largest metropolitan area in Texas, Dallas-Fort Worth. The campus is 1,200 acres including the main campus north of I-35E, the Eagle point athletic complex south of I-35E, and Discovery Park; a research campus located between state highways 77 and 380.

On behalf of the state, the university, in its civic advocacy for the state, prevailed with three new-location, capital-intensive expansions over the last  years.

 The university acquired in 1975 and subsequently developed a medical school in Fort Worth
 The university created a campus in South Dallas in 2000
 The university laid the groundwork for establishing the first public law school in the region.

In 1981, the university spun off its new medical school as its own independent institution under the UNT Board of Regents. In 2009, the University of North Texas at Dallas became its own independent institution. That same year, the Texas legislature approved the creation of University of North Texas at Dallas College of Law, opening in 2014 in Downtown Dallas as part of UNT Dallas. UNT and its three sister institutions are governed by the University of North Texas System, a system established in 1980 by the board of regents and legislatively recognized in 2003 by the 78th Texas Legislature.

In 2004, UNT opened UNT Discovery Park –  – in Denton, north of the main campus with technology incubator facilities dedicated to science and engineering. In 2011, the College of Visual Arts and Design launched the Design Research Center in downtown Dallas in the Design District.

In 2016, UNT opened a location in Hall Park in Frisco in Collin County. In 2018, UNT opened Inspire Park. UNT teaches nearly 2,000 students in Collin County each semester at Hall Park, Inspire Park and the Collin Higher Education Center in McKinney. In 2020, the Texas Higher Education Coordinating Board approved UNT building a branch campus to provide upper-level and graduate courses on 100 acres donated by the city of Frisco. Classes are expected to begin in Spring 2023.

Official designations
In 1985 the Governor's Select Committee on Higher Education recommended that North Texas be designated an "emerging national research university."  Nine years earlier, in 1976, the Carnegie Foundation designated North Texas as a "Class 1 Doctorate-Granting Institution." Four decades later, in February 2016, Carnegie elevated North Texas to its top category – Doctorate-Granting Institutions with "highest research activity." At that time, Carnegie had 115 universities listed at that level.

In 1988, U.S. Secretary of Education William Bennett cited UNT for its innovative approach to undergraduate education in the Classic Learning Core, an integrated liberal arts curriculum similar to those usually found only in small, private colleges. In 1992, UNT was elected to full membership in the Association of Public and Land-grant Universities. And, in 2011, the Texas Higher Education Coordinating Board included UNT as one of eight Emerging Research Institutions in its accountability system.

In 2020, UNT achieved designation from the Department of Education as a Title III & Title V Minority-Serving Institution (MSI) and as a Hispanic Serving Institution (HSI).

Enrollment
Certified enrollment as of the fall of 2021 was 42,372, the fifth largest in the state. For the 2019–20 academic year, the university awarded 10,270 degrees. UNT awarded 459 Ph.D. degrees from fiscal years 2009 to 2011.

Academics

Of the 14 colleges and schools, UNT offers 109 bachelor's degree programs, and 94 master's and 36 doctorate degree programs.

The student-faculty ratio at UNT is 23:1, and 28.8 percent of its classes consist of fewer than 20 students. The most popular majors include business, management, marketing, communication, journalism, English, multi/interdisciplinary studies, and visual and performing arts.

UNT has been accredited by the Southern Association of Colleges and Schools since 1924 and is among the twenty-seven universities in Texas accredited at Level VI, the highest level. As of 2020, the university was home to 22 research centers and institutes. In 2007, the university launched four Institutes of Research Excellence: (i) Advanced Environmental Research Institute, (ii) Advanced Materials and Manufacturing Processes Institute, (iii) BioDiscovery Institute, and (iv) Jim McNatt Institute for Logistics Research. In 2019, UNT launched the Center for Agile and Adaptive Additive Manufacturing.

College of Liberal Arts and Social Sciences

The College of Liberal Arts and Social Sciences houses 22 academic departments and programs and five public services (including a psychology clinic and a speech and hearing clinic), and eight student services (of which seven are labs).

College of Science
UNT has been offering Bachelor of Science degrees for  years, Master of Science degrees (in biology, mathematics, chemistry, and economics) for  years, and Doctor of Philosophy degrees in several scientific disciplines—including chemistry, biology, and physics—for  years. UNT is a sponsoring institution member (Ph.D.-granting) of Oak Ridge Associated Universities (ORAU), a consortium of 105 major research universities that leverage scientific research through partnerships with national laboratories, government agencies, and private industry. It has been a member of the consortium since 1954.

G. Brint Ryan College of Business

The College of Business is host to five academic departments: (i) Accounting, (ii) Finance, Insurance, Real Estate and Law, (iii) Information Technology and Decision Sciences, (iv) Marketing, Logistics, and Operations Management (v) Management. It offers seven undergraduate programs, fourteen M.B.A. and master of science programs, and six Ph.D. programs. In Fall 2011, the college moved into a new state-of-the-art Gold LEED certified $70 million facility named the Business Leadership Building. The college is accredited in both business and accounting by the Association to Advance Collegiate Schools of Business—accreditation for the former stretches back  years (1961) and the latter,  years (1987).

The college of business was renamed in 2019 to the G. Brint Ryan College of Business following a gift from alumnus G. Brint Ryan, alumnus and UNT System Board of Regents Chairman. The $30 million gift awarded by Ryan and his wife Amanda will create at least six endowed chairs and provide funding for academic program initiatives over seven years. Among the areas of focus are taxation and tax research, entrepreneurship, finance, logistics, information technology, cybersecurity and behavioral accounting.

Undergraduate business education
In 2018, 5,093 students were enrolled as business majors at the undergraduate level.

Graduate business education
In 2018, 691 students were working on graduate degrees. The college is host to two research centers (ii) the Institute of Petroleum Accounting and (iii) the Murphy Center for Entrepreneurship.

U.S. News & World Report's "2021 Best Online Programs" ranked UNT 31st in the nation among the Best Online Graduate Business Programs.

College of Education
The College of Education is a legacy of the university's founding as a teachers college  years ago. The college is organized as four departments and one center: (i) Counseling and Higher Education, (ii) Educational Psychology, (iii) Kinesiology, Health Promotion and Recreation, (iv) Teacher Education and Administration, and (v) The Kristin Farmer Autism Center. The college offers 12 bachelor's degrees, 19 master's degrees and 15 doctoral concentrations. As of the 2010–2011 school year, the college certified over 1,147 teachers, the second largest number in the state by a university. In 1979, the Texas Higher Education Coordinating Board approved renaming the "School of Education" to the "College of Education."  At that time, the college was the largest in Texas and the Southwest, the largest doctoral program in the state, and the twenty-fifth largest producer of teacher certificates in the United States. Its prior name, "School of Education," dates back to 1946, when the teachers college outgrew itself and reorganized as six schools and colleges.

College of Engineering
The College of Engineering, founded in 2003, inherited longstanding programs (i) Computer Science, (ii) Information Technology, and (iii) Engineering Technology—with majors in (a) Construction Engineering Technology, (b) Electronics Engineering Technology, (c) Manufacturing Engineering Technology, (d) Mechanical Engineering Technology, and (e) Nuclear Engineering Technology—and launched (iv) Computer Engineering, (v) Electrical Engineering, (vi) Materials Science and Engineering, (vii) Mechanical Engineering, and (viii) Biomedical Engineering (2014). The college is host to three research centers, one of which being the Net-Centric Software and Systems Center (launched February 24, 2009), a research consortium hosted by UNT and organized as a National Science Foundation Industry-University Cooperative Research Center (NSF I/UCRC). It is primarily funded by industry members (which  consist of 16 corporations) and universities (which  consist of 5).

College of Information
The College of Information was created in October 2008 by consolidating two existing academic units: Learning Technologies (formerly within the College of Education) and the School of Library and Information Sciences. The School of Library and Information Services was created in 1970 as an outgrowth of its former structure as the Department of Library Services. The college sponsors three research centers, one being The Texas Center for Digital Knowledge.

College of Merchandising, Hospitality and Tourism
The College of Merchandising, Hospitality and Tourism houses the largest merchandising program in the nation and one of the largest hospitality and tourism management programs. The college offers bachelor's degrees with majors in digital retailing, home furnishings merchandising, hospitality management, event design & experience management, and merchandising, and master's degrees in hospitality management, international sustainable tourism and merchandising. It has the nation's first bachelor's in digital retailing and master's in international sustainable tourism. The college was formerly known as the School of Merchandising and Hospitality Management.

College of Music

The College of Music is a comprehensive institution of international rank. Its heritage dates back  years, when North Texas was founded. The college has the largest enrollment of any music institution accredited by the National Association of Schools of Music. It has been among the largest music institutions of higher learning in North America since the 1940s. The music library, founded in 1941, has one of the largest music collections in the United States, with over 300,000 volumes of books, periodicals, scores, and approximately 900,000 sound recordings. North Texas was first in the world to offer a degree in jazz studies.  U.S. News & World Report ranked the jazz studies program as the best in the country every year from 1994, when it began ranking graduate jazz programs, to 1997, when it retired the category. The One O'Clock Lab Band has been nominated for 7 Grammy Awards.

College of Health and Public Service
Previously called the College of Public Affairs and Community Service (PACS) and before that the College of Community Service, the college adopted its current name in Fall 2017. The college is organized in seven departments: Audiology and Speech-Language Pathology; Behavior Analysis; Criminal Justice; Emergency Management and Disaster Science; Public Administration; Rehabilitation and Health Services; and Social Work.

The department of public administration is home of the nation's first comprehensive degree program in emergency and disaster management that launched in 1983. The degree incorporates interdisciplinary curricula from other colleges that include applied philosophy and environmental ethics. The degree is tailored for both management practitioners and researchers and is collaborative with the Federal Emergency Management Agency Region VI—based in Denton—which oversees Arkansas, Louisiana, New Mexico, Oklahoma, and Texas. Denton became home to FEMA when its predecessor, the Office of Civil Defense and Mobilization, constructed the nation's first Federal underground defense center in 1959.

The college is host to five research institutes, one being the Turkish Institute for Police Studies (TIPS). The institute has, since its founding in 1999, been based at North Texas. Its institution is a collaboration between the Turkish National Police (TNP) and U.S. universities in areas of terrorism, organized crime, narcotics, administration, intelligence, and investigation.

UNT and Texas Women's University began a joint Master of Social Work (M.S.W.) program in 2017.

College of Visual Arts and Design
The College of Visual Arts and Design has the 10th largest enrollment of any art and design school accredited by the National Association of Schools of Art and Design, and the second largest of any that awards doctorates. The college name changes reflect the curricular expansion of programs. In 1992, what then had been the "Department of Art" within the College of Arts and Sciences, became "School of Visual Arts;" and in 2007, it became the "College of Visual Arts and Design."  Art classes began at UNT in 1894, four years after its founding. Master's degrees were initiated in the 1930s and the first Master of Science degree in art was awarded in 1937. Since 1972, the college has served as curator and custodian of the Texas Fashion Collection that was started by Stanley Marcus in 1938.

Honors College

The Honors College offers academic enrichments, including honors seminars and exclusive classes only for high-achieving undergraduates. There is no age limit. Its classes can either supplement or substitute core coursework. Its objective is to challenge exceptional students at higher levels and to promote leadership. The college is an autonomous collegiate unit on equal footing with the other collegiate units. Academically, it offers no degrees; but its courses are integrated with the baccalaureate programs of the other ten constituent colleges and the journalism school. Graduates are awarded a special medallion. The college offers many perks, including scholarships, exchange programs, and exclusive housing—Honors Hall.

The college began as an honors program  years ago (Fall 1971). Its initial enrollment of 50, back then, quickly grew to 400. But the program lost support under a system of borrowing faculty members. The Honors Program was reconstituted in 1994 and was elevated as a college in 2005.

Mayborn School of Journalism
Curricular journalism at North Texas dates back to 1945. As a department, Journalism eventually became part of the College of Arts and Sciences. The Graduate Division of Journalism began in the fall of 1970 under the direction of Reginald Conway Westmorland. In 1999, twelve years after the death of Frank W. Mayborn, its graduate program was renamed the Frank W. Mayborn Graduate Institute of Journalism. On September 1, 2009, the entire program was elevated as its own collegiate unit and named the Frank W. and Sue Mayborn School of Journalism. Eight Pulitzer Prizes have been won by five of its alumni, among whom are Bill Moyers and Howard Swindle. Other notable alumni include Samir Husni and Cragg Hines. Since 1969, the news-editorial sequence has been accredited by the Accrediting Council on Education in Journalism and Mass Communications; and since 1986, the entire program has been accredited. The school is in its  year as founding host of the annual Mayborn Literary Nonfiction Conference.

Virginia Ellison (née Virginia Jones Paty; 1920–2009)—a North Texas alumna (BA, English, '41) who also taught English and journalism, sponsored the Student Press Club, and served as director of publicity at North Texas from 1942 to 1944—won a Pulitzer Traveling Fellowship in 1945, the year she earned a degree from the Columbia University Graduate School of Journalism.

Texas Academy of Mathematics and Science

TAMS is a two-year residential early college entrance program that has, since 1987, served exceptionally qualified Texas students who otherwise would be attending high school as juniors and seniors. It was the first of its kind in the nation and, the only in the state and one of five in the nation.

Toulouse Graduate School
The Toulouse Graduate School, founded  years ago, is the academic custodian and administrator of all graduate programs offered by nine colleges and one school. It maintains records, administers admissions, and serves various roles in recruiting. It was renamed in 1990 in honor of Robert Bartell Toulouse, EdD (1918–2017), who joined in 1948 as a professor in the College of Education, then served dean of the Graduate School from 1954 to 1982. Toulouse, before retiring as professor emeritus, had served other roles at the university, including provost and vice president of academic affairs from 1982 to 1985.

Libraries

UNT Libraries are made up of four public service points and two remote storage facilities. Willis Library is the main library on campus, housing the business, economics, education, humanities and social sciences collections along with microforms and special areas such as the Music Library, Government Documents, the Digital Library Division, Archives, and the Rare Book and Texana collections. The Media Library in Chilton Hall houses a large collection of audiovisual materials, including films, audiobooks, and video games (see Game Design, above). Video recording equipment and gaming consoles are available for checkout. The Sycamore Library houses the government documents, law, political science, geography and business collections. It also houses the Collaboration and Learning Commons, a place to study in groups, create multi-media projects, and record presentations. The Discovery Park Library supports the College of Engineering and the College of Information, Library Science, and Technologies. It covers multiple areas of engineering, library and information science, and learning technology.

The Intensive English Language Institute (IELI)
Established in 1977, IELI is the largest intensive English program (IEP) in North Texas, serving international students who wish to learn academic English in preparation for university studies in the United States. IELI is a constituent of UNT International Affairs, an interdisciplinary unit and exponent of globalization in higher education that provides leadership and support of international teaching, research, and study-abroad initiatives. , IELI has been located in Marquis Hall on the UNT Denton campus.

Student life

Residential life

All freshmen are required to live on campus to satisfy a residency requirement. 15.5% of students, or 5,620, live in on-campus residence halls. In addition, 37.3%, or 13,494, live within the city of Denton while 4,021, or 11.1% live outside of the city of Denton but within Denton County and 36.1% or 13,043 students live outside of Denton County.

Student residence halls
There are 15 residence halls on the Denton campus. UNT also offers the Residents Engaged in Academic Living (REAL) Communities program. The REAL communities offer students the ability to live with other residents in their major, and allow them to interact with each other and participate in programs that are geared toward their major or discipline. On August 22, 2011, -year-old Maple Street Hall became the first all-vegan ("Mean Greens") college cafeteria in the country. The given 14 residence hall at the University of North Texas are : Bruce Hall, Clark Hall, College Inn, Crumley Hall, Joe Greene Hall, Honors Hall, Kerr Hall, Legends Hall, Maple Hall, Mozart Square, Rawlins Hall, Santa Fe Square, Traditions Hall, Victory Hall, West Hall.

Pohl Recreation Center
The Pohl Recreation Center is the student recreation center located on the campus of the University of North Texas.

Social Greek organizations
The social Greek community is made-up of four councils that oversee 42 fraternities and sororities. Four percent of undergraduate students of both genders are members of social fraternities and sororities.

Traditions

Primary colors
North Texas adopted Green and White as its official colors during the 1902–1903 school year.

Mascot

UNT's mascot, the American eagle, was adopted on February 1, 1922, as a result of a student-faculty council debate and ensuing student election.

The eagle has had three nicknames, beginning with "Scrappy" in 1950. The human costumed eagle character, launched in 1963, carried the name "Scrappy" until 1974—during the throes of the Vietnam War—when students adopted the name "Eppy" because it sounded less warlike. Since then, the name has switched back and forth, from Eppy to Scrappy; but for the last  years, the name "Scrappy" has endured.

Nickname for intercollegiate athletics
The name "Mean Green," now in its  year, was adopted by fans and media in 1966 for a North Texas football defensive squad that finished the season second in the nation against the rush. That season, Joe Greene, then a sophomore at North Texas, played left defensive tackle on the football team and competed in track and field (shot put). The nickname "Mean Joe Greene" caught-on during his first year with the Pittsburgh Steelers in 1969 when Pittsburgh fans wrongly assumed that "Mean Green" was derived from a nickname Joe Greene had inherited while at North Texas. The North Texas athletic department, media, and fans loved the novelty of the national use of its nickname, and its association with Joe Greene's surname and university's official school color. By 1968, "Mean Green" was branded on the backs of shirts, buttons, bumper stickers, and the cover of the North Texas football brochure.

Fight song
Francis Edwin Stroup, EdD (1909–2010), emerged in 1939—ten years after graduating from North Texas—as the winning composer (lyrics and music) of a university sponsored fight song competition organized by Floyd Graham. He taught summers at North Texas from 1939 to 1942.  The song, "Fight, North Texas," has endured for  years and the lyrics have changed minimally to reflect the name changes of the university.  While serving as an associate professor at the University of Wyoming from 1946 to 1950, Stroup rewrote the lyrics for the chorus to "Ragtime Cowboy Joe," which was adopted in 1961 as the university's fight song.  After serving as head of the Physical Education Department at Southern Arkansas University from 1950 to 1959, Stroup became Professor of Physical Education at Northern Illinois University.  While there, Stroup rewrote the lyrics to the chorus of Alonzo Neil Annas' (1882–1966) NIU "Loyalty Song" (1942), which was informally adopted in 1961 and officially 1963 as the "Huskie Fight Song." Stroup also composed songs for Drake University and the University of Chicago.  A collegiate academician who played piano mostly by ear and neither majored nor worked in music, Stroup lived to be 101, a number exceeding the songs he composed by one digit.  Stroup was inducted in the Halls of Fame of Northern Illinois University and the University of North Texas (1987).

Alma mater
In 1919, Julia Smith (1905–1989), while a music student, and Charles Kirby Langford (1903–1931), then a third-year letterman on the football team and an outstanding overall athlete, composed "Glory to the Green and White" which was adopted as the school's alma mater in 1922. Smith wrote the music and Langford wrote the lyrics.

Other traditions

The Spirit Bell—a  bell brought from Michigan in 1891—was a curfew bell from 1892 to 1928. The Talons, a spirit and service organization formed in 1960, acquired it in the 1964, mounted it on a wagon, and began the tradition of running it around the football field to rally fans. It was retired to the University Union in 1982 after it developed a crack. A similar  Spirit Bell is currently in use at games. A different organization by the name "Talons" was founded in 1926 as the first social fraternity at North Texas.

On Homecoming Fridays, the Talons light a bonfire built from wooden pallets, typically in a 40-by-40-by-25-foot-height structure. The tradition has endured since the 1930s.

"Boomer" is a cannon fired by the Talons at football games since the 1970s. It is a 7/8th scale M1841 6 pound, smooth bore muzzleloader, resting on hand-crafted solid oak from the campus. Talon alumni have restored it three times, the most recent being in the Fall of 2007, adding a custom  for transport and equipment.

The Mean Green Machine, a green and black 1931 Ford Model A Tudor Sedan, is driven by the Talons Motorpool Committee at football games and special events. It was donated by alumnus Rex Cauble in 1974. In 2012, a team of engineering students installed a NetGain WarP 9 electric engine. , the Mean Green Machine has been re-equipped with a modified Model A engine after complications with the electric engine.

McConnell Tower, the clock tower atop the Hurley Administration Building at the center of campus, is bathed in green light for victories. The clock is depicted on the official class ring with two different times on its faces: 1:00 (for the One O'Clock Lab Band) and 7:00—the curfew initiated in 1892.

The eagle talon hand signal is formed by curling the thumb and index and middle fingers forward—the ring and pinkie fingers stay closed against the palm.

Broadcast, print, and digital media

Broadcast
KNTU (88.1 FM), licensed and owned by the university and operated by students, has, for  years, broadcast to the North Texas region. Jazz has always been a feature of the station; but in 1981, it became the predominant format. KNTU began broadcasting in stereo in 1986 and, on March 22, 1988, increased its broadcasting power from 6,700 watts to 100,000, extending its reach to about a 60-mile radius from its tower located on the Denton campus. KNTU is part of the Mean Green Radio Network, which reaches 10 million listeners. Under the guidance of now-retired faculty member Bill Mercer, several sports broadcasters and radio personalities have emerged from North Texas, including Dave Barnett formerly of ESPN, George Dunham, and Craig Miller.

NTTV, UNT's 24-hour cable television station, features student-produced and student-centric programming.

Student publications
North Texas Review is an annual publication of the English Department. It is produced by UNT students and exclusively features works—art, poetry, fiction, non-fiction—by UNT students.

Student yearbooks through the years have included Cotton-tail (1906), Yucca (1907–1974), Wings (1977–1980), and Aerie (1982–2007).  Aerie ceased publication after the 2007 edition, following a trend of the digital age cited by The Economist in 2008.

North Texas is the home of American Political Science Review . The journal moves among national universities every four to six years. UNT will be the first university in the South or Southwest to house the publication. 

The North Texas Daily is the official university daily newspaper, staffed by students. Print issues are published Tuesday through Friday during the fall and spring semesters, and weekly during the summer. The paper was founded in 1916 as The Campus Chat and adopted its current name in 1971.

Athletics

, North Texas sponsored fifteen athletic teams that compete at the intercollegiate level of NCAA Division I—for men: football; for men and women: basketball, track & field, cross country, and golf; for women only: diving, soccer, softball, swimming, tennis, and volleyball. UNT has been a member of Conference USA for  years.

Football

In its –year history of intercollegiate athletics, the North Texas football team has won 24 conference championships, with the last four occurring from 2001 to 2004 in the Sun Belt Conference.  , the team has appeared in thirteen bowl games, winning three including the 1946 Optimist Bowl, the 2002 New Orleans Bowl and the 2014 Heart of Dallas Bowl. Currently, Seth Littrell serves as the head coach, and is in his th year as head coach. From 1952 to 2010, home football games were played at Fouts Field. In 2011, UNT began playing in newly constructed Apogee Stadium.

Men's basketball

The North Texas men's basketball team won the 2006–07 Sun Belt Conference championship and advanced to the NCAA Tournament. The season marked the beginning of four consecutive seasons of 20-plus wins. North Texas won the Sun Belt Conference championship again during the 2009–10 season, and again advanced to the NCAA Tournament. The – season marks the  season that the UNT Coliseum has served as the home for Men's basketball.

Women's basketball

The head coach of the North Texas Mean Green women's basketball team is Jalie Mitchell.

Notable alumni 

As of 2020, the University of North Texas had approximately 448,000 living alumni. More than 304,000 reside in the Dallas–Fort Worth Metroplex.

R'Bonney Nola Gabriel - Miss Texas USA 2022, Miss USA 2022, and Miss Universe 2022.

Sustainability 

In 2005, UNT launched the first PhD program in Environmental Ethics in the world.  Three years later, the university became the first large public university in Texas to sign the "American College and University President's Climate Commitment" (ACUPCC). , twenty-four of the 658 signatory institutions of higher learning were from Texas. Of those twenty-four, five were full undergraduate-graduate institutions (2 private, 3 public). Of those five, UNT was the largest. The objectives include achieving carbon neutrality by 2040 and ensuring that all new university buildings and facilities meet a minimum Leadership in Energy and Environmental Design (LEED) Silver rating by the U.S. Green Building Council The university continued to promote sustainability in 2017 when it purchased a year worth of renewable energy credits, to allow the University of North Texas to be powered by renewable energy.

The Life Science Complex, built in 2011, became UNT's first LEED certified structure, earning a Gold rating. The Complex is a state-of-the-art research facility that houses the university's biochemistry, molecular biology, developmental physiology, genetics and plant sciences programs. The building features four climate-controlled rooftop greenhouses and one of the country's most sophisticated aquatics laboratories with more than 2,500 tanks.  Also in 2011, Apogee Stadium, the -year-old football stadium, became the first newly built sports stadium in the nation to earn a Platinum LEED certification, the highest of four certifications. The facility features wind turbines, eco-friendly building materials, and native landscape architecture.

The following year, The Princeton Review's Guide to 322 Green Colleges, 2012 Edition, listed UNT for the second consecutive year, citing its top 17-percent ranking among green-compliant universities nationwide under ACUPCC. The article stated that forty percent of the energy on campus is derived from renewable sources, and 43 percent of the buildings have undergone energy retrofits. The campus has posted strong numbers in recycling: since 2009, the university has recycled nearly 1,000 tons of waste materials. UNT offers graduate degrees in Environmental Science and Public Administration and Management.

Further reading
The Portal to Texas History is an undertaking of the North Texas Libraries Digital Projects Unit. 
 Texas State Historical Association, housed on the Denton campus , administers its website and distributes its Handbook of Texas Online. The association had previously been at the University of Texas at Austin since its founding in 1897. 
 UNT Research Magazine is an annual digital magazine. It was founded as ReSource (with various subtitles) in 1992 and adopted its current name in 2006.

See also
 American Literary Review is a national magazine of poetry, fiction, and nonfiction by writers at all stages in their careers. It was founded in 1990. The Review is largely student run, with faculty editorial oversight. In the fall of 2013, the Review become exclusively an online digital publication. 
 Environmental Ethics is a peer-reviewed academic journal covering the study of philosophical aspects of environmental problems. It was established in 1979.
 University of North Texas Press, founded in 1987, is a relatively young albeit prolific book publisher with more than 300 titles in print.

Notes

References

External links

 
 North Texas Athletics website
 

 
University of North Texas System
1890 establishments in Texas
Educational institutions established in 1890
University of North Texas
Universities and colleges accredited by the Southern Association of Colleges and Schools
University of North Texas
Education in Denton County, Texas
Tourist attractions in Denton, Texas
University of North Texas